Jean-Rene Baby Belizar (born 2 August 1988) is a Sint Maartener cricketer.

A right-handed batsman and right-arm off break bowler, Belizar was selected in Sint Maarten's squad for the 2008 Stanford 20/20. Having received a bye into the first round after Cuba could not fulfill their preliminary round fixture, Belizar made his Twenty20 debut in the first-round match against Saint Vincent and the Grenadines, which despite an unbeaten century from John Eugene, Sint Maarten lost by 10 runs and were eliminated from the tournament. This marks Belizar's only appearance in Twenty20 cricket. He later played for Sint Maarten in the semi-final of the 2009 Leeward Islands Tournament against Antigua and Barbuda.

See also
List of Sint Maarten Twenty20 players

References

External links
Jean-Rene Belizar at ESPNcricinfo
Jean-Rene Belizar at CricketArchive

Living people
1988 births
Sint Maarten cricketers
Sint Maarten representative cricketers